Estadio La Barranquita is a multi-use stadium in Santiago, Dominican Republic.  It is currently used mostly for football matches.  The stadium holds 20,000.

External links
Stadium information

Football venues in the Dominican Republic
Athletics (track and field) venues in the Dominican Republic
Buildings and structures in Santiago Province (Dominican Republic)
Santiago de los Caballeros